Głębokie  is a village in the administrative district of Gmina Bytnica, within Krosno Odrzańskie County, Lubusz Voivodeship, in western Poland. 

The village has a population of 40.

References

Villages in Krosno Odrzańskie County